Sir William Joseph Jordan  (19 May 1879 – 8 April 1959) was a New Zealand Labour Party member of Parliament, and New Zealand's longest-serving high commissioner to the United Kingdom from 1936 to 1951.

Early life

Jordan was born in Ramsgate, Kent, the son and grandson of fishing boat captains. His father William Joseph Jordan was a member of the lifeboat crew that earned fame and exploits on the Goodwin Sands. His mother was Elizabeth Ann Catt. He attended St George's Church of England Boys' School in Ramsgate, later becoming president of the Old Boys' Association. The decline of the local fishing industry forced the Jordan family to move to London. William then attended St Luke's Parochial School, Old Street in London and wore the characteristic old-fashioned uniform which was well known. Aged 12 he left school (1892) and became an apprentice coach painter, from which he resigned on account of the scourge of lead poisoning. He then entered the postal service in 1896 and reached a responsible position at Mount Pleasant (headquarters of the Postal Service). While there, he showed his preference in politics by joining the Fawcett Association. Jordan later joined the London Metropolitan Police and underwent training at Scotland Yard, afterwards being stationed at Limehouse in East End of London. He was also a member of the part-time 3rd London Rifle Volunteer Corps, rising to the rank of sergeant.

Jordan emigrated to New Zealand in 1904, initially working as a labourer and bush farming. He joined the Labour Party in 1907, as the first secretary of the Wellington branch of the party. In 1911 he unsuccessfully stood for the Wellington City Council on a Labour Party ticket, as he did in the 1919 election in the Raglan constituency.

First World War
Unlike many other early Labour Party leaders, e.g. Harry Holland, Michael Joseph Savage and Peter Fraser, Jordan was not a conscientious objector. He enlisted in the First New Zealand Expeditionary Force in France in 1917. In March 1918, Jordan saw action for the first time, and suffered serious wounds in action two weeks later. He transferred to the Army Education Service, where he served as an instructor on beekeeping until the end of the war, returning to New Zealand in 1919.

Parliamentary career

In 1922, Jordan was surprisingly elected as one of 17 Labour Party MPs, winning the seat of Manukau increasing his majority at each of the four subsequent elections, until he had one of the largest votes and majorities. Jordan had an earlier unsuccessful attempt to win the Raglan seat for Labour in the 1919 general election.

In early 1935 the Jordan affair pitted Jordan against the Auckland Labour Representation Committee when he proposed to stand for the Auckland Electric Power Board as an independent when the LRC decided not to nominate an official Labour candidate, but he was supported by Labour leader Michael Joseph Savage.

He was the Labour Party's senior whip from December 1935 until he resigned in June 1936.

Jordan was a diligent local MP, and held his seat until Labour won the government benches in 1935. Jordan had expected to be elevated to cabinet; instead he was appointed to the post of New Zealand High Commissioner to London, which had until that point been traditionally a retirement post for former cabinet ministers; Labour being first elected to power in 1935 had no MPs with previous cabinet experience.

Sporting involvement
Jordan was also involved in sports. He was the patron of the Ellerslie Rugby League Club from 1933 to 1935.

New Zealand High Commissioner to London

Jordan served as New Zealand's high commissioner to London from September 1936 to 1951. Until 1941, London was New Zealand's only diplomatic posting, and Jordan became prominent as New Zealand's official representative overseas. Jordan was actively involved as New Zealand's representative to the League of Nations. Jordan served as president of the League of Nations in 1938. While Europe was heading towards war, Jordan's public position was that war was inconceivable. In 1938 Jordan wrote to Prime Minister Savage, stating that "we shall not see war involving our Empire in our lifetime". Just before war broke out he spoke in similar terms in a broadcast to New Zealand. As he said six months later, right up to that date, "I could not believe that the world was so mad as to go to war." During his time on the League of Nations, he suggested in 1937 that the organization should intervene on Spain during the Spanish Civil War and then hold free and fair elections on the country, but the proposal has fallen on deaf ears within the organization.

Jordan was highly regarded during the war for his loyalty to New Zealand servicemen and women, and his care for soldiers.

Jordan's reputation among officials and cabinet colleagues was much less warm. He frequently refused instructions from Wellington on the basis that remote officials at home could not accurately assess New Zealand's position. Jordan was loathed by his deputies, Major General W. G. Stevens and Dick Campbell. Secretary of External Affairs Alister McIntosh had frequent difficulties with Jordan. Deputy Prime Minister Walter Nash had feuds with Jordan, stemming from Nash's position representing the Prime Minister at international gatherings that Jordan felt was his own right to represent.

Despite this, Jordan remained a popular figure among the public in New Zealand. In 1949, with the Labour Party defeated from office, the incoming National Government decided to retain Jordan in his post, until 1951. He was appointed a Knight Commander of the Order of St Michael and St George in the 1952 Queen's Birthday Honours. He was a Christian Socialist and Methodist home missionary. He died in Auckland on 8 April 1959.

Awards
 Knight Commander of the Order of St Michael and St George (KCMG)
 Honorary doctorates from Cambridge University and St Andrews University
 Privy Councillor
 Freedoms of the cities of London and Ramsgate.

Notes

References

 (with biographical appendix)
 

|-

|-

|-

1879 births
1959 deaths
New Zealand Methodists
New Zealand Labour Party MPs
English emigrants to New Zealand
People from Ramsgate
New Zealand Knights Commander of the Order of St Michael and St George
League of Nations people
High Commissioners of New Zealand to the United Kingdom
Permanent Representatives of New Zealand to the League of Nations
Members of the New Zealand House of Representatives
New Zealand MPs for Auckland electorates
New Zealand military personnel of World War I
Unsuccessful candidates in the 1919 New Zealand general election
New Zealand members of the Privy Council of the United Kingdom
New Zealand politicians awarded knighthoods